Owe My Love is a 2021 Philippine television drama series broadcast by GMA Network. It premiered on the network's Telebabad line up and worldwide via GMA Pinoy TV from February 15, 2021 to June 4, 2021.

Series overview

Episodes

References

Lists of Philippine drama television series episodes